Katherine S. Newman (born February 21, 1953) is an American academic administrator who currently serves as the System Chancellor for Academic Programs, the Senior Vice President for Economic Development and the Torrey Little Professor of Sociology at UMass Amherst. Newman previously served as the interim Chancellor of the University of Massachusetts Boston from July 1, 2018 to August 1, 2020. She previously served as the Senior Vice President for Academic Affairs of The University of Massachusetts system in the Office of the President in Boston, Provost of UMass Amherst, a professor of sociology at Johns Hopkins University, Princeton University, and Harvard University, and is an American author. Newman received a Robert F. Kennedy Book Award for No Shame in My Game in 2000. In February 2020, UMass System President Marty Meehan appointed Newman as the System Chancellor of Academic Programs.

Bibliography 

 Law and Economic Organization: A Comparative Study of Preindustrial Societies (1983)
 Falling from Grace: Downward Mobility in the Age of Affluence (1989)
 Declining Fortunes: The Withering Of The American Dream (1993)
 No Shame in My Game: The Working Poor in the Inner City (1999)
 A Different Shade of Gray: Midlife and Beyond in the City (2003)
 Rampage: The Social Roots of School Shootings (2004) with David Harding, Cybelle Fox, Jal Mehta, and Wendy Roth. 
 Chutes and Ladders: Navigating the Low-Wage Labor Market (2006)
 The Missing Class: Portraits of the Near Poor in America (2007), with Victor Tan Chen
 Who Cares?: Public Ambivalence and Government Activism from the New Deal to the Second Gilded Age (2010), with Elisabeth Jacobs
 Taxing the Poor: Doing Damage to the Truly Disadvantaged (2011), with Rourke O'Brien
 The Accordion Family: Boomerang Kids, Anxious Parents, and the Private Toll of Global Competition (2012)
 After Freedom: The Rise of the Post-Apartheid Generation in Democratic South Africa (2014), with Ariane De Lannoy
 Reskilling America: Learning to Labor in the Twenty-First Century (2016), with Hella Winston
 Downhill from Here: Retirement Insecurity in the Age of Inequality (2019)

References

1953 births
Living people
American sociologists
American women sociologists
Johns Hopkins University faculty
Princeton University faculty
Harvard University faculty
UC Berkeley School of Law faculty
21st-century American women